The 2006–07 Wigan Athletic F.C. season was the club's 29th season in the Football League and their second season in the Premier League.

Season summary
The club struggled to repeat the successes of its previous season and fell victim to "second season syndrome". They were knocked out of both domestic cups at the first round of entry, and finished 17th in the league after securing Premier League survival on the last day of the season in an away win against Sheffield United, who were relegated instead on goal difference.

A day after the end of the season, manager Paul Jewell resigned after six years in charge of the club. His assistant manager Chris Hutchings was appointed as his replacement. Summer signing Emile Heskey (signed for a record fee of £5.5 million) finished the season as the club's top goalscorer with a total of nine goals, and left-back Leighton Baines won the Supporters' Player of the Year award, and the Players' Player award.

Final league table

Results
Wigan Athletic's score comes first

Legend

FA Premier League

Results by matchday

FA Cup

League Cup

Squad

Left club during season

Transfers

In

Out

Released

Loans in

Loans out

Statistics

Appearances and goals
Up to end of season

|-
! colspan=14 style=background:#dcdcdc; text-align:center| Goalkeepers

|-
! colspan=14 style=background:#dcdcdc; text-align:center| Defenders

|-
! colspan=14 style=background:#dcdcdc; text-align:center| Midfielders

|-
! colspan=14 style=background:#dcdcdc; text-align:center| Forwards

|-
! colspan=14 style=background:#dcdcdc; text-align:center| Players transferred out during the season

|}

Notes

A.  For more information about this transfer, see Webster ruling.
B.  Kirkland initially signed on a six-month loan, but the deal was made permanent on 27 October 2006.
C.  Haestad initially signed on loan until the end of the season, but the deal was ended early.
D.  Cywka was initially loaned out for a month, but the deal was later extended.
E.  Pollitt was initially loaned out for a month, but was recalled early by Wigan

See also
List of Wigan Athletic F.C. seasons
2006–07 in English football

References

External links
Wigan Athletic 2006/07 fixtures

Wigan Athletic F.C. seasons
Wigan Athletic